Cyclops elegans is a freshwater copepod species in the genus Cyclops.

References

External links

 Cyclops elegans on www.marinespecies.org

Cyclopoida
Crustaceans described in 1884